Edmund Greene (20 April 1921 – 20 May 1997) was a Barbadian cricketer. He played in eight first-class matches for the Barbados cricket team from 1943 to 1946.

See also
 List of Barbadian representative cricketers

References

External links
 

1921 births
1997 deaths
Barbadian cricketers
Barbados cricketers
People from Saint George, Barbados